Rei Higuchi (Japanese: 樋口黎; born 28 January 1996) is a Japanese freestyle wrestler who won a silver medal in the 57 kg division at the 2016 Olympics. He won the gold medal in the 61kg event at the 2022 World Wrestling Championships held in Belgrade, Serbia.

Higuchi studies at the Nippon Sport Science University. He fractured his right hand in October 2015, but won the All Japan Tournament in December that year.

On 28 January 2017 he competed at the Golden Grand Prix Ivan Yarygin 2017, in the qualification he was eliminated by Gadzhimurad Rashidov of Russia, but he went on to wrestle back and win a bronze medal against Bulat Batoev of Russia.

References

External links
 

1996 births
Living people
Japanese male sport wrestlers
Olympic wrestlers of Japan
Wrestlers at the 2016 Summer Olympics
Olympic medalists in wrestling
Medalists at the 2016 Summer Olympics
Olympic silver medalists for Japan
World Wrestling Champions
Asian Wrestling Championships medalists
21st-century Japanese people